Saitama 12th district is a constituency of the House of Representatives in the Diet of Japan.

List of Representatives

Election Results

2021

2017

2014

2012

2009

2005

2003

Honda was elected in PR following the resignation of Atsushi Kinoshita.

2000

1996

Kojima was elected in PR following the resignation of Yōjirō Nakajima.

References

Districts in Saitama Prefecture
Districts of the House of Representatives (Japan)